Duke of Dino (Italian: Duca di Dino) was a noble title of the Kingdom of Naples, later the Kingdom of the Two Sicilies.

The title referred to the island of Dino in the Tyrrhenian Sea, off Praia a Mare in Calabria. It was created on 9 November 1815 by King Ferdinand for the French diplomat and statesman Charles-Maurice de Talleyrand-Périgord, in recognition of his service at the Congress of Vienna. 

Talleyrand ceded the title to his nephew Edmond on 2 December 1817. To prevent the breakup of the estates, Edmond ceded the Dino property to his second son Alexandre (husband of Valentine de Sainte-Aldegonde), while his elder son Louis was styled Duke of Valençay and later inherited the Duchy of Sagan. Alexandre in turn ceded the property to his elder son Maurice. Alexandre and Maurice were styled Duke of Dino, but the transfer of the associated property within the family had no power to alter the order of succession according to the original patent. The senior descendant of Edmond was confirmed as Duke of Dino by the King of Italy in 1912, the Kingdom of the Two Sicilies having ended in 1861 during the process of Italian unification. 

The last male heir to the titles died in 1968. However, in 1975 exiled former King of Italy Umberto II issued a diploma confirming Manuel Gonzalez de Andia, Marquis of Villahermosa as Duke of Dino, with a remainder failing male issue to his elder daughter Maria Louisa and her husband. Manuel was the son of Luis Dreyfus y Gonzalez de Andia, Marquis of Villahermosa (son of Auguste Dreyfus by his second wife) and Félicie de Talleyrand-Périgord, sister of the last Duke. His daughter Maria Louisa assumed the title until her death in 2015, when it passed to her older surviving son, Javier de Villegas y Gonzalez de Andia.

Family tree of the Dukes of Dino

References

Dukes in the Kingdom of The Two Sicilies
Dukes of Italy
1815 establishments in Italy
Noble titles created in 1815